Magdalena Lewy-Boulet (née Lewy; born August 1, 1973), commonly known as either Magdalena or Magda Boulet, is an American runner from Oakland, California. Born in Jastrzębie-Zdrój, Poland, Lewy-Boulet became a U.S. citizen on September 11, 2001.

Sport career 
Lewy Boulet finished second at the 2008 U.S. Olympic Team Trials - Women's Marathon, held on April 20, 2008, in Boston, Massachusetts, in a then personal-best time of 2:30:19. She led the race for the first 24 miles before being overtaken by eventual winner Deena Kastor. During the women's marathon at the 2008 Summer Olympics, a lingering knee injury forced Lewy Boulet to drop out 20 kilometres into the race.

In the IAAF World Cross Country championships, she has earned two bronze medals representing the USA in the team competition, in 2010 and 2011. Individually, she finished 20th in the 2010 race and 18th in the 2011 race.

She has also won the 2002 San Francisco Marathon, and finished sixth overall and first among American women at the 2009 New York City Marathon. She finished second at the 2010 Rotterdam Marathon, in a personal best time of 2:26:22.  At the 2010 Chicago Marathon, she finished 7th in a time of 2:28:44. In other road racing performances, she was the top American finisher at the NYRR New York Mini 10K, but her time of 33:25 was only enough for eleventh overall. In September, she won the 20K national title at the New Haven Road Race in a time of 1:07:41, some 45 seconds ahead of runner-up Stephanie Rothstein.

She won the Western States 100-Mile Endurance Run in 2015, her debut 100-mile race, in a time of 19:05:21.

In 2019, she won the Leadville 100-mile race, in a time of 20:18:07.

Personal life and coaching
Lewy-Boulet is sponsored by CORE Foods, Hoka One One, and GU Energy Gel. She was assistant track & field coach at University of California - Berkeley, working under Tony Sandoval through 2009-2010 school year. She is married to Richie Boulet.

Lewy-Boulet is currently coached by Jack Daniels.

Achievements
All results regarding marathon, unless stated otherwise

Personal records
100 miles - 19:05:21 (Western States 100 2015)
Marathon - 2:26:22 (Rotterdam NED 2010)
Half Marathon - 1:11:46 (San Jose CA USA 2009)
10,000 metres -  31:48.58 (Eugene OR USA 2011)
5,000 metres - 15:14.25 (Stockholm SWE 2011)

References

External links
 
 
 Interview with ATHLETE Director David Lam

1973 births
Living people
American female long-distance runners
Polish emigrants to the United States
Athletes (track and field) at the 2008 Summer Olympics
American female marathon runners
Olympic track and field athletes of the United States
People from Jastrzębie-Zdrój
Long Beach City College alumni
University of California, Berkeley alumni
21st-century American women